Iotapa (who lived in the 1st century) was a daughter of King Sampsiceramus II of Emesa who married the Herodian Prince Aristobulus Minor.

Biography 
Iotapa was an Arab Syrian Princess from the Royal family of Emesa who lived in the 1st century. She was the daughter of King Sampsiceramus II and Queen Iotapa who ruled Emesa. She was of Syrian, Armenian, Greek and Median descent.

Iotapa was born and raised in Emesa (modern Homs Syria).

Iotapa married the Herodian Prince Aristobulus Minor, who was of Jewish, Nabataean and Edomite ancestry. He was a grandson of King of Judea, Herod the Great.  This marriage for Aristobulus Minor was a promising marriage in dynastic terms. Iotapa and Aristobulus chose to live as private citizens in the Middle East.

Iotapa and Aristobulus had a daughter called Iotapa, was born deaf and mute. Apart from their daughter, they had no further descendants.

Sources

Egyptian Royal Genealogy

References

See also
 Iotapa (disambiguation)

Year of birth missing
Year of death missing
People from Homs
1st-century women
1st-century Arabs
Herodian dynasty
People from Roman Anatolia
Roman client rulers
Emesene dynasty